Sju svarta be-hå is a 1954 Swedish crime film directed by Gösta Bernhard and starring Dirch Passer. The plot is based on the 1928 novel The Twelve Chairs by Soviet writers Ilf and Petrov.

Cast
 Dirch Passer - Jens Nielsen
 Annalisa Ericson - Gertrud Hall, actress (as Anna-Lisa Ericsson)
 Åke Grönberg - Sture Kaxe
 Hjördis Petterson - Sofia Pang (as Hjördis Pettersson)
 Stig Järrel - Captain Jacob Grönkvist
 Katie Rolfsen - Tina Andersson
 Irene Söderblom - Defrauded Lady
 Siv Ericks - Margareta Beckman
 Rut Holm - Hilda Johansson
 Anna-Lisa Baude - Valborg Jeppman
 Gösta Bernhard - Drunk
 Curt Åström - Vesslan
 John Melin - Burglar
 Ulla-Carin Rydén - Miss Svensson
 Nils Olsson - Beggar
 Georg Adelly - Policeman

External links

1954 films
1950s Swedish-language films
1954 crime films
Swedish black-and-white films
Films directed by Gösta Bernhard
Ilf and Petrov
Swedish crime films
1950s Swedish films